In music, a drum stroke is a movement which produces a single or multiple notes on drums or other percussion instruments such as cymbals. There are several types of strokes: four basic single strokes (noted below), double strokes, and other multiple strokes such as triples, quadruples, or buzzes of indeterminate number.

Basic strokes
The basic strokes produce a single hit or notes while resulting in different sounds. They are produced by different movements.
The full stroke begins with the tip of the drumstick held 8-12" (20-30 cm) above the striking surface. The drummer strikes the drum and then returns the stick back up to its original position.
The down stroke begins with the tip at the same height as the full stroke, but upon striking the drum head, the drummer keeps the stick low (about an inch above the striking surface).
The up stroke begins with the tip of the stick hovering about an inch above the head of the drum. The drummer strikes the surface, then brings the stick up to full stroke or down stroke position.
In the tap, the stick begins at the same position as the up stroke and remains there after striking.

The four basic strokes are used to produce a variety of accented and unaccented beat combinations.

Other strokes
Push/Pull or Push-Pull Strokes, dual fulcrum strokes with alternated wrist and finger motions.
Moeller Method Strokes, the same 4 basic strokes as above, but with a dual fulcrum whipping motion. 
Gladstone Free Strokes, with a completely uninhibited rebound in full, half, or low varieties.
Freehand or Gravity Strokes, a dual fulcrum stroke using the rim for alternating up and down halves.
Ghost Notes, basic taps or up strokes played at a lower volume than the surrounding notes, the inverse of an accent.

See also
Drum rudiment
Ghost note
Beat (music) 
Backbeat

References

 
Percussion performance techniques